Jeferson Douglas dos Santos Souza (born 19 March 2001), known as Jeferson Douglas, is a Brazilian professional footballer who plays as a midfielder for Al-Wasl.

Career statistics

Club

Honours
Bahia
Campeonato Baiano: 2020

References

2001 births
Living people
Sportspeople from Salvador, Bahia
Brazilian footballers
Association football midfielders
UAE Pro League players
Esporte Clube Bahia players
Al-Wasl F.C. players
Brazilian expatriate footballers
Brazilian expatriate sportspeople in the United Arab Emirates
Expatriate footballers in the United Arab Emirates